I Sold Gold is the third album by Aqueduct. It was released January 25, 2005 on Barsuk Records.  Two tracks, "Growing Up With GNR" and "Heart Design", released with I Sold Gold come from Aqueduct's first album, Power Ballads, which was released in 2003.  The album has been described as the fusion of drum beat, synthpop, and piano which has led some to make comparisons with The Flaming Lips, Modest Mouse, and Frank Black.

Track listing
"The Suggestion Box" – 2:19
"Hardcore Days & Softcore Nights" – 3:53
"Growing Up With GNR" – 3:29
"Heart Design" – 3:34
"Five Star Day" – 3:32
"Tension" – 2:58
"The Unspeakable" – 4:14
"Frantic (Roman Polański Version)" – 3:04
"Laundry Baskets" – 5:01
"Game Over: Thanks for Playing" – 2:29
"The Tulsa Trap" – 2:41

2005 albums
Aqueduct (band) albums
Barsuk Records albums